Live in Miami is the eleventh live album/DVD by contemporary Christian worship band Hillsong United, released on 14 February 2012 through their own label. The album was recorded at the American Airlines Arena on 6 August 2011 as part of their tour promoting their second studio album, Aftermath (2011).

Their first live album since Across the Earth (2009), Live in Miami contains eight songs from Aftermath, two songs from first studio album All of the Above, and several songs from previous live albums. Unlike previous live recordings, the album does not contain new songs. The album peaked in the Top 50 on the ARIA Albums Chart.

Background
Having led worship in churches, stadiums and open fields around the world, United's Live in Miami is the first live album from the band since 2009 and features 22 tracks, all captured during the band's sold-out worship night in Miami. In 2011, best-selling modern worship band Hillsong United brought a new and fresh approach to tours, visuals, songs and multimedia to the U.S. for the widely successful "Aftermath Tour". The tour logged sold out worship nights in venues across the country - from New York to Los Angeles (where the band became the first Christian band to sell out Staples Center) and back east to Miami where the CD and DVD were recorded.

Track listing

Track listing (DVD/Blu-Ray)
 "Go"
 "Break Free"
 "You"
 "Search My Heart"
 "Mighty To Save"
 "Hosanna"
 "All I Need Is You"
 "Bones"
 "Nova"
 "Aftermath"
 "Freedom Is Here/Shout Unto God"
 "Like An Avalanche"
 "Rhythms of Grace"
 "Oh You Bring"
 "The Stand"
 "From The Inside Out"
 "A Song To Sing..."
 "With Everything"
 "Your Name High"
 "Take It All"
 "Yours Forever"
 "Take Heart"

Bonus Features
 "In The Aftermath"

Other songs played
The song "Rise" found in the God Is Able album was played during the concert. Nevertheless, it was not included in the album.

Personnel

Vocalists  Joel Houston, Matt Crocker, Jad Gillies, Jonathon Douglass, Hayley Law, Jill McCloghry, Dylan Thomas
Electric guitars Timon Klein, Dylan Thomas, Jad Gillies, Joel Houston
Acoustic guitars Jad Gillies, Joel Houston, Dylan Thomas
Bass Adam Crosariol
Drums Simon Kobler
Keys Peter James
Additional drums and percussion Matt Crocker, Jonathon Douglass (Tambourine), Joel Houston (on "Go"), Dylan Thomas (on "From the Inside Out")
Synthesizers Jonathon Douglass, Joel Houston, Jill McCloghry, Dylan Thomas. 
iPad synthesizer Matt Crocker (on "Bones" and the DVD's introduction video)

Charts
Singles chart

Chart procession and succession

References

Hillsong United albums
Live video albums
2012 live albums
2012 video albums

es:Live in Miami (álbum de Hillsong United)